The moriche oriole (Icterus cayanensis chrysocephalus) is a passerine bird in the New World family Icteridae. It is unrelated to Old World orioles (family Oriolidae). It is a breeding resident in the tropics of eastern South America. This bird is noted for its close association with the palm Mauritia flexuosa (moriche, buriti, ita, ité, etc.).

This ecologically distinct bird was formerly treated as a species Icterus chrysocephalus. It was eventually found to be embedded in the epaulet oriole (I. cayanensis) clade. Thus, for example the AOU since 2005 has lumped the moriche oriole into I. cayanensis. The subspecific structure of I. cayanensis is still rather puzzling.

It has mainly black plumage, apart from a bright yellow crown, rump, thighs and wing epaulets. The sexes are similar, but the juvenile bird is dark brown rather than black, with duller yellow patches.

The song of the moriche oriole is a squeaky whistling . This is an often-conspicuous species near its favored tree, and usually occurs singly or in pairs.

The mochique oriole breeds from eastern Colombia, Venezuela, Trinidad and the Guianas, and south to eastern Ecuador, Paraguay and northern Brazil. The Trinidadian population may have originated from recent colonization or escapes.

The moriche oriole is a bird closely associated with moriche palms (Mauritia flexuosa), and it is found in the forests, swamps or savannah where that tree occurs. This bird eats mainly insects, but will also take nectar and some fruit. Its nest is a long hanging basket of grass and other plant fibers, suspended from the end of a moriche palm branch. The normal clutch is two dark-spotted pale blue or white eggs.

It is affected to some extent by trapping for the cagebird trade, but can cope with heavy disturbance to its habitat as long as some moriche palms remain.

Footnotes

References 
 
 ffrench, Richard; O'Neill, John Patton & Eckelberry, Don R. (1991): A guide to the birds of Trinidad and Tobago (2nd edition). Comstock Publishing, Ithaca, N.Y. 
 Hilty, Steven L. (2003): Birds of Venezuela. Christopher Helm, London. 
 Jaramillo, Alvaro & Burke, Peter (1999): New World Blackbirds. Christopher Helm, London. 
 Salaman, Paul G.W.; Stiles, F. Gary; Bohórquez, Clara Isabel; Álvarez-R., Mauricio; Umaña, Ana María; Donegan, Thomas M. & Cuervo, Andrés M. (2002): New and noteworthy bird records from the east slope of the Andes of Colombia. Caldasia 24 (1): 157–189. PDF fulltext
 South American Classification Committee (SACC) (2008): Icterus cayanensis. In: A classification of the bird species of South America – Part 11. Oscine Passeriformes, C (Cardinalidae to end). Version of 2008-MAR-31. Retrieved 2008-APR-01.

Icterus (genus)
Orioles
Birds described in 1766
Taxa named by Carl Linnaeus